Rupert Davies FRSA (22 May 191622 November 1976) was a British actor. He is best remembered for playing the title role in the BBC's 1960s television adaptation of Maigret, based on Georges Simenon's novels.

Life and career

Military service
Davies was born in Liverpool. After service in the British Merchant Navy he was a Sub-Lieutenant Observer with the Fleet Air Arm during the Second World War. In 1940, the Swordfish aircraft in which he was flying ditched in the sea off the Dutch coast, following which he was captured and interned in the Stalag Luft III prisoner of war camp. He made three attempts to escape, all of which failed. During his captivity he began to take part in theatre performances, entertaining his fellow prisoners.

Acting
On his release Davies resumed his career in acting almost immediately, starring in an ex-prisoner of war show, Back Home, which was hosted at the Stoll Theatre, London. In 1959, he played the role of the Colonel in Alun Owen's The Rough and Ready Lot when it received its stage debut on 1 June 1959 in a production by the 59 Theatre Company at the Lyric Opera House, Hammersmith, as well as in the television adaptation which was broadcast that September.

He became a staple of British television, appearing in numerous plays and series, including Quatermass II, Ivanhoe, Emergency – Ward 10, Danger Man, Man in a Suitcase, The Champions, Doctor at Large (1971), Arthur of the Britons and War and Peace (1972). He also provided the voice of Professor Ian "Mac" McClaine in the Gerry Anderson series Joe 90. A pipe smoker, like Jules Maigret, in 1964, having released a 45rpm single "Smoking My Pipe" late the previous year that capitalised on the Maigret opening sequence, he became the first person to win the Pipe Smoker of the Year award.

He was the subject of This Is Your Life in October 1962 when he was surprised by Eamonn Andrews in central London.

Davies also played supporting roles in many films, appearing briefly as George Smiley in The Spy Who Came In from the Cold (1965). He also appeared in several horror films in the late 1960s, including Witchfinder General (1968) and Dracula Has Risen from the Grave (1968), as well as such international films as Waterloo (1970) and Zeppelin (1971).

Death
He died of cancer in London in 1976, leaving a wife, Jessica, and two sons, Timothy and Hoagan. Davies is buried at Pistyll Cemetery, near Nefyn, Gwynedd, Wales.

Selected filmography

 Private Angelo (1949) (uncredited)
 Seven Days to Noon (1950) as Bit Part (uncredited)
 The Dark Avenger (1955) as Sir John
 The Traitor (1957) as Clinton
 The Key (1958) as Baker
 Next to No Time (1958) as Auction Organiser (uncredited)
 Sea Fury (1958) as Bosun
 Violent Moment (1959) as Bert Glennon
 Breakout (1959) as Morgan
 Idol on Parade (1959) as Sergeant (uncredited)
 Life in Emergency Ward 10 (1959) as R.S.O. Tim Hunter
 Sapphire (1959) as Jack Ferris
 John Paul Jones (1959) as British Captain
 Bobbikins (1959) as Jock Fleming
 Devil's Bait (1959) as Landlord
 Danger Tomorrow (1960) as Dr. Robert Campbell
 The Criminal (1960) as Edwards
 The Spy Who Came In from the Cold (1965) as George Smiley
 The Uncle (1965) as David Morton
 The Brides of Fu Manchu (1966) as Jules Merlin
 Target for Killing (1966) as Kommissar Saadi
 Five Golden Dragons (1967) as Comm. Sanders
 Submarine X-1 (1968) as Vice-Adm. Redmayne (uncredited)
 Witchfinder General (1968) as John Lowes
 Dracula Has Risen from the Grave (1968) as Monsignor
 Curse of the Crimson Altar (1968) as The Vicar
 The Oblong Box (1969) as Kemp
 Waterloo (1970) as Gordon
 The Firechasers (1971) as Prentice
 The Night Visitor (1971) as Mr. Clemens
 Zeppelin (1971) as Captain Whitney
 Danger Point (1971) as Man
 Frightmare (1974) as Edmund Yates
 King Arthur, the Young Warlord (1975) as Cerdig, Chief of the Saxons

Selected television roles

 Quatermass II (1955) as Vincent Broadhead (2 episodes)
 Sailor of Fortune (1955-8) as Various roles (20 episodes)
 My Friend Charles (1956) as Robert Brady (4 episodes)
 The Adventures of Aggie (1957) as Ollie Nickell
 Folio - The Unburied Dead (1957) as Canoris 
 The Honourable Member (1957) as Robert Whitlock MP 
 The Adventures of Charlie Chan (1957-8) as Inspector Duff (11 episodes)
 The Adventures of Robin Hood (1958) as Simon Dexter
 Ivanhoe (1958) as Brother Gareth
 The Adventures of Ben Gunn (1958) as Captain Flint
 The Invsible Man (1958) as Dushkin
 Armchair Theatre (1958-66) as Various roles (7 episodes)
 Interpol Calling (1959) as Coetzee
 The Flying Doctor (1959) as Frank Selby
 The Third Man (1959) as Inspector Arthur Shillings (5 episodes)
 World Theatre (1959) as Cook
 Suspense (1960) as Michael Crowe
 The True History of Passion (1960) as Caiaphus
 Maigret (1960-3) as Inspector Jules Maigret (All 52 episodes)
 Danger Man (1961) as Colonel Graves
 Festival (1964) as Chief of Police
 The Wednesday Play - The Big Breaker (1964) as Councillor Wally Cross
 Front Page Story (1965) as Felix Rackstro
 ITV Play of the Week - The Successor (1965) as Cardinal of Bologna
 Man in a Suitcase (1967) as Santiago Gomez
 The Champions (1968) as Voss
 Joe 90 (1968-9) as Professor Ian 'Mac' Maclaine (30 episodes)
 BBC Play of the Month - Maigret at Bay (1969) as Inspector Jules Maigret
 Never Mind the Quality, Feel the Width (1969) as Bishop Flynn
 Biography (1970) as Sir Almroth Wright
 Doctor at Large (1971) as Inspector Barker
 Man at the Top (1971) as Harvey Clayton
 Thirty-Minute Theatre - The Proposal (1971) as Lomov
 The Man Outside (1972) as Baker (13 episodes)
 War and Peace (1972-3) as Count Rostov (14 episodes)
 Arthur of the Britons (1972-3) as Cerdig (3 episodes)
 Orson Welles Great Mysteries - A Terribly Strange Bed (1973) as Lemerle
 Marked Proposal (1974) as Dr. Jack Morrison (8 episodes)
 Father Brown (1974) as Colonel Arthur Druce
 Play for Today - The After Dinner Game (1975) as Bartley Humbolt

References

External links

1916 births
1976 deaths
20th-century English male actors
Male actors from Liverpool
Best Actor BAFTA Award (television) winners
English male film actors
English people of Welsh descent
British Merchant Navy personnel
British World War II prisoners of war
English male stage actors
English male television actors
English male voice actors
Deaths from cancer in England
Fleet Air Arm personnel of World War II
Royal Navy officers of World War II
Stalag Luft III prisoners of World War II